The 3rd Parliament of Queen Elizabeth I was summoned by Queen Elizabeth I on 17 February 1571 and assembled on 2 April 1571. The number of Members of Parliament (MPs) had grown from 402 to 438 since the last Parliament of 1559.

To head off the usual problems caused by religious debate and calls for her to marry, Elizabeth instructed Parliament to deal with other issues and appointed lawyer Christopher Wray as Speaker of the House of Commons.

However, a number of bills concerning religious practices were introduced, only two of which were passed before Elizabeth claimed that religious practices in England were entirely her responsibility as head of the Church of England. Parliamentary complaints about the misuse of royal licences also met with Royal censure.

Nevertheless, several important statutes were passed legalizing moneylending, and for the maintenance of farmland and the navy. A further bill made it treasonable to support the recent bull of excommunication received by Elizabeth from Pope Pius V.  
Altogether a total of 29 statutes and 12 private measures were enacted by the time the 3rd Parliament was dissolved on 29 May 1571.

Notable Acts of the Parliament
 Treasons Act 1571
 Bulls, etc., from Rome Act 1571
 Fraudulent Conveyances Act 1571
 Letters Patent Act 1571
 Ecclesiastical Leases Act 1571
 Ordination of Ministers Act 1571
 Attainders of Earl of Westmorland and others Act 1571
 Oxford and Cambridge Act 1571

Notable members
Henry Neville - served for Berkshire in this Parliament

See also
 Acts of the 3rd Parliament of Elizabeth I
 List of parliaments of England

References

England and Wales. Parliament. The journals of all the Parliaments during the reign of Queen Elizabeth, both of the House of Lords and House of Commons. Collected by Sir Simonds D'Ewes ... Reviewed and published by Paul Bowes. London, 1682.

1571 establishments in England
1571 in politics